Szemerédi's regularity lemma is one of the most powerful tools in extremal graph theory, particularly in the study of large dense graphs. It states that the vertices of every large enough graph can be partitioned into a bounded number of parts so that the edges between different parts behave almost randomly.

According to the lemma, no matter how large a graph is, we can approximate it with the edge densities between a bounded number of parts. Between any two parts, the distribution of edges will be pseudorandom as per the edge density. These approximations provide essentially correct values for various properties of the graph, such as the number of embedded copies of a given subgraph or the number of edge deletions required to remove all copies of some subgraph.

Statement 
To state Szemerédi's regularity lemma formally, we must formalize what the edge distribution between parts behaving 'almost randomly' really means. By 'almost random', we're referring to a notion called -regularity. To understand what this means, we first state some definitions. In what follows  is a graph with vertex set .

Definition 1. The edge density of the pair  is defined as:

We call a pair of parts -regular if, whenever you take a large subset of each part, their edge density isn't too far off the edge density of the pair of parts. Formally,

Definition 2.

The natural way to define an -regular partition should be one where each pair of parts is -regular. However, some graphs, such as the half graphs, require many pairs of partitions (but a small fraction of all pairs) to be irregular. So we shall define -regular partitions to be one where most pairs of parts are -regular.

Definition 3. A partition of  into  sets  is called an -regular partition if

Now we can state the lemma:

Szemerédi's Regularity Lemma. For every  and positive integer  there exists an integer  such that if  is a graph with at least  vertices, there exists an integer  in the range  and an -regular partition of the vertex set of  into  sets.

At one time it was hoped that the true bound was much smaller, which would have had several useful applications. In particular the best bound has level exactly 4 in the Grzegorczyk hierarchy, and so is not an elementary recursive function.

Proof

We shall find an ε-regular partition for a given graph following an algorithm. A rough outline:

 Start with an arbitrary partition (could just be 1 part)
 While the partition isn't ε-regular:
Find the subsets which witness ε-irregularity for each irregular pair.
Simultaneously refine the partition using all the witnessing subsets.

We apply a technique called the energy increment argument to show that this process terminates after a bounded number of steps. Basically, we define a monovariant which must increase by a certain amount in each step, but it's bounded above and thus cannot increase indefinitely. This monovariant is called 'energy' as it's an  quantity.

Definition 4. Set . The energy of the pair  is defined as:

Specifically,

Observe that energy is between 0 and 1 because edge density is bounded above by 1:

Now, we start by proving that energy does not decrease upon refinement.

Lemma 1.
Then define the random variable . The expectation is

The second moment is

By convexity, . Rearranging, we get that  for all .

Thus the refinement step in the algorithm doesn't lose any energy.

Lemma 2.

Proof: Define  as above. Then,

 

Now we can prove the energy increment argument, which shows that energy increases substantially in each iteration of the algorithm.

Proof: For all  such that  is not -regular, find  and  that witness irregularity (do this simultaneously for all irregular pairs). Each  is partitioned into at most  parts as desired. Then,

By Lemma 1, the above quantity is at least

By lemma 2, the above sum is at least

But the second sum is at least  since  is not -regular, so we deduce the desired inequality. 

Now, starting from any partition, we can keep applying Lemma 3 as long as the resulting partition isn't -regular. Then this process can be repeated at most  times, before it terminates and we must have an -regular partition.

Applications

Graph counting lemma 
If we have enough information about the regularity of a graph, we can count the number of copies of a specific subgraph within the graph up to small error.

Graph Counting Lemma. Let  be an -vertex graph with vertex sets  such that  is -regular whenever .

This can be combined with Szemerédi's regularity lemma to prove the Graph removal lemma. The graph removal lemma can be used to prove Roth's Theorem on Arithmetic Progressions, and a generalization of it, the hypergraph removal lemma, can be used to prove Szemerédi's theorem.

The graph removal lemma generalizes to induced subgraphs, by considering edge edits instead of only edge deletions. This was proved by Alon, Fischer, Krivelevich, and Szegedy in 2000. However, this required a stronger variation of the regularity lemma.

Szemerédi's regularity lemma does not provide meaningful results in sparse graphs. Since sparse graphs have subconstant edge densities, -regularity is trivially satisfied. Even though the result seems purely theoretical, some attempts  have been made to use the regularity method as compression technique for large graphs.

Frieze-Kannan regularity 

A different notion of regularity was introduced by Frieze and Kannan, known as the weak regularity lemma. This lemma defines a weaker notion of regularity than that of Szemerédi which uses better bounds and can be used in efficient algorithms.

Given a graph , a partition of its vertices  is said to be Frieze-Kannan -regular if for any pair of sets :

The weak regularity lemma for graphs states that every graph has a weak -regular partition into at most  parts.

This notion can be extended to graphons by defining a stepping operator.

A partition  is weak -regular if:

The weak regularity lemma for graphons states that every graphon has a weak -regular partition into at most  parts. As with Szemerédi's regularity lemma, the weak regularity also induces a counting lemma.

Algorithmic Applications 

One of the initial motivations for the development of the weak regularity lemma was the search for an efficient algorithm for estimating the maximum cut in a dense graph. It has been shown that approximating the max-cut problem beyond 16/17 is NP-hard, however an algorithmic version of the weak regularity lemma gives an efficient algorithm for approximating the max-cut for dense graphs within an  additive error. These ideas have been further developed into efficient sampling algorithms for estimating max-cut in dense graphs.

The smaller bounds of the weak regularity lemma allow for efficient algorithms to find an -regular partition. Graph regularity has further been used in various area of theoretical computer science, such as matrix multiplication and communication complexity.

Strong regularity lemma 
The strong regularity lemma is a stronger variation of the regularity lemma proven by Alon, Fischer, Krivelevich, and Szegedy in 2000. Intuitively, it provides information between non-regular pairs and could be applied to prove the induced graph removal lemma.

Statement 
For any infinite sequence of constants , there exists an integer  such that for any graph , we can obtain two (equitable) partitions  and  such that the following properties are satisfied:

Proof 
We apply the regularity lemma repeatedly to prove the stronger version. A rough outline:

 Start with  be an  regular partition

 Repeatedly find its refinement  that is  regular.

Here  corresponds to the bound of parts in regularity lemma when . 

By the energy increment argument, .

By our choice of  the regular and refinement conditions hold. The energy condition holds trivially. Now we argue for the number of parts. We use induction to show that , there exists  such that . By setting , we have . By setting , we have

Remarks on equitable 
A partition is equitable if the sizes of any two sets differ by at most . By equitizing in each round of iteration, the proof of regularity lemma could be accustomed to prove the equitable version of regularity lemma.

A useful Corollary

Statement 
For any infinite sequence of constants , there exists  such that there exists a partition  and subsets  for each  where the following properties are satisfied:

 
  is -regular for each pair 
  for all but  pairs

Motivation 
The corollary explores deeper the small energy increment. It gives us a partition together with subsets with large sizes from each part, which are pairwise regular. In addition, the density between the corresponding subset pairs differs "not much" from the density between the corresponding parts.

Proof of corollary 
The full version can be proved by picking more subsets from each part that are mostly pairwise regular and combine them together.  

Let .

We argue that the subsets  satisfy all the conditions with probability . 

By setting  the first condition is trivially true since  is an equitable partition. Note that  

So by Markov's inequality , so with probability , at most  pairs could have . By union bound, the probability that all conditions hold .

History and Extensions 

 first introduced a weaker version of this lemma, restricted to bipartite graphs, in order to prove  Szemerédi's theorem,
and in  he proved the full lemma. Extensions of the regularity method to hypergraphs were obtained by Rödl and his collaborators and Gowers.

János Komlós, Gábor Sárközy and Endre Szemerédi later (in 1997) proved in the blow-up lemma that the regular pairs in Szemerédi regularity lemma behave like complete bipartite graphs under the correct conditions. The lemma allowed for deeper exploration into the nature of embeddings of large sparse graphs into dense graphs.

The first constructive version was provided by Alon, Duke, Lefmann, Rödl and Yuster.
Subsequently, Frieze and Kannan gave a different version and extended it to hypergraphs. They later produced a different construction due to  Alan Frieze and Ravi Kannan that uses singular values of matrices. One can find more efficient non-deterministic algorithms, as formally detailed in Terence Tao's blog and implicitly mentioned in various papers.

An inequality of Terence Tao extends the Szemerédi regularity lemma, by revisiting it from the perspective of probability theory and information theory instead of graph theory. Terence Tao has also provided a proof of the lemma based on spectral theory, using the adjacency matrices of graphs.

It is not possible to prove a variant of the regularity lemma in which all pairs of partition sets are regular. Some graphs, such as the half graphs, require many pairs of partitions (but a small fraction of all pairs) to be irregular.

A stronger variation of the regularity lemma was proven by Alon, Fischer, Krivelevich, and Szegedy while proving the induced graph removal lemma. This works with a sequence of  instead of just one, and shows that there exists a partition with an extremely regular refinement, where the refinement doesn't have too large of an energy increment.

Szemerédi's regularity lemma can be interpreted as saying that the space of all graphs is totally bounded (and hence precompact) in a suitable metric (the cut distance). Limits in this metric can be represented by graphons; another version of the regularity lemma simply states that the space of graphons is compact.

References

Further reading
.
.

External links
 Edmonds, Chelsea; Koutsoukou-Argyraki, Angeliki; Paulson, Lawrence C. Szemerédi's regularity lemma (Formal proof development in Isabelle/HOL, Archive of Formal Proofs)

Lemmas in graph theory
Information theory